Gompholobium muticum is a species of flowering plant in the family Fabaceae and is endemic to the south-west of Western Australia. It is a low, bushy shrub with grooved, cylindrical leaves and pink or green, pea-like flowers.

Description
Flowering occurs from October to November and the fruit is a cylindrical pod.

Taxonomy
This species was first formally described in 1864 by George Bentham, who gave it the name Gompholobium aristatum var. muticum in Flora Australiensis. In 2008, Jennifer Anne Chappill raised the variety to species status as Gompholobium muticum in Australian Systematic Botany. The specific epithet (muticum) means "blunt", referring to the leaves.

Distribution and habitat
Gompholobium muticum grows in depressions, flats, hills and roadsides in the Avon Wheatbelt, Geraldton Sandplains, Jarrah Forest and Swan Coastal Plain biogeographic regions of south-western Western Australia.

Conservation status
Gompholobium muticum is classified as "not threatened" by the Western Australian Government Department of Parks and Wildlife.

References

muticum
Eudicots of Western Australia
Plants described in 1864
Taxa named by George Bentham